In the 8th century BC, the Etruscans expanded their power to Northern and Southern Italy, specifically towards Emilia and Campania, where they founded Etruscan dominions that are modernly known under the names of Padanian Etruria and Campanian Etruria.  Moving from the northern city-states of the Etruscan Dodecapolis they swept into the Po valley through the Apennine passes.

History

The Greek and Latin ancient writers tell us that an Etruscan expansion into Southern Italy, present day Campania region, and northwards into the Po Valley occurred yet in the 9th century BC.

Following their usual methods, the Etruscan conquerors in the colonial areas overlapped themselves over the ancient inhabitants of the conquered regions imposing their culture and their political institutions. Consequently, as in Tuscany, the cities they founded in the Po valley and along the Adriatic coast formed a Dodecapolis (a federation or league of twelve cities), but, as for the original Etruscan Dodecapolis, we do not really know which cities were part of it. Inside Padanian Etruria, it is supposed they were ‘’Felsina’’ (Bologna), Spina and Marzabotto, while we can only guess about Ravenna, Cesena, Rimini, Modena, Parma, Piacenza, Mantua and possibly, but improbably, Milan.

The founder of these cities and of their League had been Ocnus, brother or son of Aulestes, according some authors,  Tarchon according to others. More probably, as the archaeological evidence suggests, both the traditions have to be accepted but must also be ascribed to two different moments of profound change in the political and economic framework of the Padanian Etruria.

A "First etruscan colonization," referred to the legendary Tarchon, can be traced to the early Iron Age (9th century BC). It was aimed to find new lands for agricultural uses; a "Second colonization", dated to the mid-6th century BC, can be attributed to the as much legendary Ocnus. The latter colonization involved the reorganization of the entire Padanian region in order to increase its utility for the etruscan businesses and trades.

During the 6th century BC Etruria experienced significant social, political and economic transformations. The formative process of the city-states had concluded, within these polities the power of the great aristocratic families was matched and then replaced by that of a new social class of men whose wealth was based mainly on trade.

The protagonists of this process were people of the northern cities of Tuscany. The Padanian Etruria is transformed in best way to serve the new commercial purposes: the trade routes are reinforced and developed, the previous settlements became real cities, better linked amongst them by a closer collaborative relationship, developing in an effective etruscan Dodecapolis.

The cities of Padanian Etruria
From the late 9th century BC, the human settlement in the Lower Po valley, previously organized in small groups of huts scattered throughout the country and mostly inhabited by Umbrians or other Italics, centers in some major urban areas as Bologna, the main city of Padanian Etruria, and Verucchio, then flourishing settlement in the heart of Romagna, by initiative of the etruscan colonists.

Felsina
The area around Bologna has been inhabited since the 9th century BC, as evidenced by the archeological digs in the 19th century in nearby Villanova. This period, and up to the 6th century, is in fact generally referred to as villanovian, and had various nuclei of people spread out around this area. In the 7-6th centuries BC, Etruria began to have an influence on this area, and the population went from Umbrian to Etruscan. The town was renamed Felsina.

Verucchio
Traces of a 12th-9th century BC settlement, supposed of Villanovan origin, have been found in Verucchio. Later it was an Etruscan possession. The current town derives its name from Vero Occhio ("True Eye"), referring to its privileged position offering a wide panorama of the surrounding countryside and the Romagna coast.

Forcello di Bagnolo San Vito

Mantua
A settlement existed as early as around 2000 BC on the banks of the Mincio, on a sort of island which provided natural protection. In the 6th century BC it was an Etruscan village which, in Etruscan tradition, was re-founded by Ocnus.
The name derives from the Etruscan god Mantus, of Hades. After being conquered by the Cenomani, a Gallic tribe, the city was conquered between the first and second Punic wars by the Romans, who attributed its name to Manto, a daughter of Tiresias. The new territory was populated by veteran soldiers of Augustus. Mantua's most famous ancient citizen is the poet Publius Vergilius Maro, Virgil (Mantua me genuit), who was born near the city in 70 B.C. at the village now known as Virgilio.

Adria
The first settlements built on the area are of Venetic origin, during the 12-9th century BC. At that time the main stream of the Po, the Adria channel, flowed into the sea by this area. The Villanovan culture, named for an archaeological site at the village of Villanova, near Bologna (Etruscan Felsina), flourished in this area from the 10th until as late as the 6th century BC. The foundations of classical Atria are dated from 530 to 520 BC.[3]
The Etruscans built the port and settlement of Adria after the channel was not the main stream anymore. During the later period of the 6th century BC the port continued to flourish. The Etruscan-controlled area of the Po Valley was generally known as Padanian Etruria (Padanian referring to the Po River), as opposed to their main concentration along the Tyrrhenian coast south of the Arno.
Greeks[4] from Aegina[5] and later from Syracuse by Dionysius I colonised the city making it into an emporion. Greeks had been trading with the Eneti from the sixth century BC.[6]
Mass Celtic incursions into the Po valley resulted in friction between the Gauls and Etruscans and intermarriage, attested by epigraphic inscriptions on which Etruscan and Celtic names appear together. The city was populated[7] by Etruscans, Eneti, Greeks and Celts.

Spina
Spina was an Etruscan port city on the Adriatic at the ancient mouth of the Po, south of the lagoon which would become the site of Venice. Spina may have had a Hellenised indigenous population.

Notes

Etruscans
Villanovan culture